Farakala is a village and commune in the Cercle of Sikasso in the Sikasso Region of southern Mali. In the 2009 census it had a population of 7,960.

References

External links
.

Communes of Sikasso Region